Alexei Ilich Likhachyov (1894, Serpukhov, Moscow Governorate — 5 January 1948, Cheboksary) was a Soviet medic and statesman. Director of Rostov State Medical University in 1930—1935 and Minister of Health of the Chuvash Autonomous Soviet Socialist Republic in 1946—1947.

Biography 
Likhachyov was born in 1894 in Serpukhov, Moscow Governorate. In 1919 he graduated from the Medical Faculty of Moscow Imperial University. Soon after that he was mobilized into the Red Army and took part in the Civil War in Russia.

After the end of the war he worked in different places: he was the head of the City Health Department in Ufa (1922—1925), the head of the Health Department of Astrakhan Oblast (1925—1928), the head of Health Department of Tersky District (1928—1930), the Director of Rostov Medical Institute (now Rostov State Medical University) (1930—1935), the head of the Regional Health Department of North Caucasus (1935—36) and was the Chief Physician of Rostov Clinical Hospital (1936—1941).

With the outbreak of Great Patriotic War, in June 1941 Likhachyov was appointed People's Commissar of Health of the Chuvash Autonomous Soviet Socialist Republic. In 1946-1947 he held the post of Minister of Health of the Chuvash Autonomous Soviet Socialist Republic. During his time in this office he supervised the arrangement of the network of medical and preventive institutions in the republic, its sanitary and epidemiological status.

He died on 5 January 1948 in Cheboksary.

References 

1894 births
1948 deaths
Moscow State University alumni
Academic staff of Rostov State Medical University